Sterlibashevo (Stärlebaş) is a rural locality (a selo) and the administrative center of Sterlibashevsky District in the Republic of Bashkortostan, Russia. Population:

References

Rural localities in Sterlibashevsky District